George F. Coulouris is a British computer scientist and the son of actor George Coulouris.  He is an emeritus professor of Queen Mary, University of London and is currently Visiting Professor in Residence at University of Cambridge Computer Laboratory. He is co-author of a textbook on distributed systems. He was instrumental in the development of ICL's Content Addressable File Store (CAFS) and he developed em, the Unix editor, which inspired Bill Joy to write vi.

Education 
In 1960 George Coulouris graduated with an honours degree in Physics from University College London.

Career
Colouris worked at IBM and other companies before joining the London Institute of Computer Science as a Research Assistant and then Imperial College London as a lecturer in 1965.

In 1971 he joined Queen Mary College as a lecturer. He became a reader in 1973 and a professor in 1978. He retired from Queen Mary in 1998, and has been a visiting professor at the University of Cambridge since.

Family 

Prof Coulouris's name is of Greek heritage, as he is the son of actor George Coulouris, whose father was a Greek immigrant to Britain married to an English woman.  George Coulouris's sister was artist Mary Louise Coulouris.

References

External links 
 Home page at Cambridge

Alumni of University College London
Academics of Imperial College London
Academics of Queen Mary University of London
Academics of the University of Cambridge
Living people
English people of Greek descent
1937 births